The 4th World Soundtrack Awards were awarded on 9 October 2004 in Ghent, Belgium.

Winners 

 Soundtrack Composer of the Year:
 Gabriel Yared - Cold Mountain
 Best Original Soundtrack of the Year:
 Cold Mountain - Gabriel Yared
 Best Original Song Written for a Film:
 "You Will Be My Ain True Love" - Cold Mountain
 Composed by Sting
 Performed by: Alison Krauss
 Lyrics by Sting
 Discovery of the Year:
 Gustavo Santaolalla - 21 Grams
 Public Choice Award:
 Harry Potter and the Prisoner of Azkaban - John Williams
 Lifetime Achievement Award:
 Alan and Marilyn Bergman
 Major Contribution to the Art of Film Music and Sound
 Prince & The Revolution - Purple Rain
 Best Young Belgian Composer
 Steven Prengels for Wekker Tam-Tam

0